During the 2019–20 season, the Guildford Flames participated in the Elite Ice Hockey League for their third season. It will be the 28th year of ice hockey played by the Guildford Flames and the thirteenth season under Paul Dixon as head coach.

The home fixture against the Belfast Giants on 19 February 2020 was selected for live TV coverage on FreeSports. However this never materialised because Freesports required a central camera/commentary position that the Spectrum does not naturally have available within the layout of the ice rink. They did use the existing options last season but did not wish to do that again. However, the club determined the only way for them to meet the FreeSports request involved the displacement of an estimated 75–90 season ticket holders in order to position scaffolding over seated areas which the club opted against.

On 13 March 2020, two weekends before the regular season was due to end, league officials cancelled all remaining matches due to be held; this was as a result of the COVID-19 pandemic in the United Kingdom.

2019–20 roster

Coaching staff
Head coach Paul Dixon
Assistant coach/bench coach Milos Melicherik
 Kit manager Sam Smith

Management
CEO Rob Hepburn
Commercial Manager/Senior Advisor Kirk Humphreys

Schedule and results

Preseason

Regular season

League standings at time of cancellation

References

External links
Official Guildford Flames website

Guildford Flames seasons